Verticordia verticordina is a flowering plant in the myrtle family, Myrtaceae and is endemic to a small area near the coast of the south-west of Western Australia. It is a small, low-growing shrub with crowded leaves and in spring, scattered pale greenish-cream and golden brown flowers. Its unusual flowers and fleshy leaves give the plant a superficial resemblance to a Darwinia.

Description

The staminodes are pointed, longer than the stamens, and are a golden-brown colour. The fleshy appearance of the leaves, almost entire margin of the sepals and the long style, distinguish this plant from other species of Verticordia and give it a superficial resemblance to Darwinia. Flowering time is from September to December.

Taxonomy and naming
Veticordia verticordina was first formally described in 1864 by Ferdinand von Mueller, who gave it the name Chamelaucium verticordina. The description was published in Fragmenta phytographiae Australiae and the type specimen was collected by George Maxwell in what is now the Cape Le Grand National Park. The specific epithet (verticordina) referred to its similarity to a Verticordia. In 1865, George Bentham changed the name to Darwinia verticordina. When Alex George reviewed the genus Verticordia in 1991, he included this species, conserving the specific epithet ("like a verticordia").

George placed this species in Verticordia subg. Verticordia as the sole member of section Elachoschista.

Distribution and habitat
This verticordia occurs near the south coast of Western Australia between Esperance and Israelite Bay in the Esperance Plains and Mallee biogeographic regions where it grows near coastal granite outcrops in wet and sandy clay. It is sometimes found growing in heath with Verticordia plumosa var. grandiflora.

Conservation
Verticordia verticordina is classified as "Priority Three" by the Western Australian Government Department of Parks and Wildlife, meaning that it is poorly known and known from only a few locations but is not under imminent threat.

Use in horticulture
Although not having the horticultural potential of other verticordias, V. verticordina is relatively easy to propagate from cuttings and can be grown in pots or hanging baskets but does not flower prolifically.

References

verticordina
Endemic flora of Western Australia
Myrtales of Australia
Rosids of Western Australia
Vulnerable flora of Australia
Plants described in 1864
Taxa named by Ferdinand von Mueller